The city of Thessaloniki in Macedonia, Greece, for several centuries the second-most important city of the Byzantine Empire, played an important role for Christianity during the Middle Ages and was decorated by impressive buildings. Because of Thessaloniki's importance during the early Christian and Byzantine periods, the city contains several Paleochristian monuments that have significantly contributed to the development of Byzantine art and architecture throughout the Byzantine Empire and Serbia. The evolution of Imperial Byzantine architecture and the prosperity of Thessaloniki go hand in hand, especially during the first years of the Empire, when the city continued to flourish. Despite the capture of Thessaloniki by the Ottoman Empire in 1430, the Christian monuments were not destroyed, and travelers such as Paul Lucas and Abdulmejid I document the city's wealth in Christian monuments during the Ottoman control of the city.

In 1988, fifteen monuments of Thessaloniki were listed as  UNESCO World Heritage Sites:
City Walls (4th/5th centuries)
Rotunda of Saint George (4th century)
Church of Acheiropoietos (5th century)
Church of St. Demetrios (7th century)
Latomou Monastery (6th century)
Church of St. Sophia (8th century)
Church of Panagia Chalkeon (11th century)
Church of St. Panteleimon (14th century)
Church of the Holy Apostles (14th century)
Church of St. Nicholas Orphanos (14th century)
Church of St. Catherine (13th century)
Church of Christ Saviour (14th century)
Blatades Monastery (14th century)
Church of Prophet Elijah (14th century)
Byzantine Bath (14th century)

Gallery

References

External links

World Heritage Sites in Greece
Buildings and structures in Thessaloniki
Christianity in late antiquity
 
Tourist attractions in Thessaloniki